Vagg is a surname. Notable people with the surname include:

Barrie Vagg (born 1943), Australian rules footballer
Bob Vagg (born 1940), Australian long-distance runner
Bob Vagg (born 1941), Australian rules footballer

Stephen Vagg, Australian writer